The Sealdah–Sitamarhi Express is an express train service in India operated by the Indian Railways. It currently operates with 13123/13124 train numbers.

Routes

The train travels on the following route:
Sealdah–––––––––––––––––––––––Sitamarhi Junction.

Schedule

Traction
SDAH to BJU: Howrah-based WAG-4
BJU to SMI: Samastipur-based WDM-3A
SMI to BJU: Samastipur-based WDM-3A
BJU to SDAH: Howrah-based WAG-4

References

https://indiarailinfo.com/train/gallery/videos-pictures-sealdah-muzaffarpur-fast-passenger-53131/2928/325/560
https://expresstrainroute.com/amptrains/53131-sealdah-muzaffarpur-fast-passenger
https://www.youtube.com/watch?v=ELdTNibLiLw

External links

Express trains in India